The 2007 World Taekwondo Championships were the 18th edition of the World Taekwondo Championships, and were held in Beijing, China from May 18 to May 22, 2007.

Medal table

Medal summary

Men

Women

Team ranking

Men

Women

References

External links
Official Website
WTF Medal Winners

World Championships
World Taekwondo Championships
World Taekwondo Championships
Taekwondo Championships
Sports competitions in Beijing
Taekwondo competitions in China